Tegher may refer to:
Tegher monastery, Armenia
Tegher, Armenia, village in Armenia